Battista de Ventura (died 1492) was a Roman Catholic prelate who served as Bishop of Avellino e Frigento (1465–1492) and Bishop of Frigento (1455–1465).

Biography
On 12 September 1455, he was appointed during the papacy of Pope Paul II as Bishop of Frigento.
On 20 May 1465, he was appointed during the papacy of Pope Paul II as Bishop of Avellino e Frigento.
He served as Bishop of Avellino e Frigento until his death in 1492. 
While bishop, he was the principal co-consecrator of Pietro Guglielmo de Rocha, Archbishop of Salerno (1471).

References

External links and additional sources
 (for Chronology of Bishops) 
 (for Chronology of Bishops) 
 (for Chronology of Bishops) 
 (for Chronology of Bishops) 

15th-century Italian Roman Catholic bishops
Bishops appointed by Pope Paul II
1492 deaths